The Wyckoff House, or Pieter Claesen Wyckoff House, is a historic house at 5816 Clarendon Road in the Canarsie neighborhood of Brooklyn in New York City. The house is within Milton Fidler Park.

It is situated on land that Wouter van Twiller purchased from the local Lenape people in approximately 1636. (Europeans often referred to the native inhabitants simply by the Lenape language place name for the larger area: "Canarsie", in this case.) The house was one of several ordered built by Wouter van Twiller before he was recalled to Holland by 1640. The house is estimated to have been built before Van Twiller returned to Holland,  16361640. The Wyckoff family moved in, ca. 1652, The house is one of the oldest surviving examples of a Dutch frame house in America, and it was one of the first structures built by Europeans on Long Island. The majority of the current structure was added in the 19th century, with the small kitchen section dating back to the 18th century.

It is owned by New York City but is operated by The Wyckoff House & Association. It was declared a National Historic Landmark in 1967 and is a New York City designated landmark.

See also
 Wyckoff-Bennett Homestead, another historic house in Brooklyn
 List of the oldest buildings in New York
 New Netherland

References

External links

 Wyckoff House Museum - official site
 Wyckoff House Museum - official Facebook presence
 Pieter Claesen Wyckoff House Historic Marker Database

Dutch-American culture in New York City
Houses on the National Register of Historic Places in Brooklyn
National Historic Landmarks in New York City
Saltbox architecture in New York
Museums in Brooklyn
Historic house museums in New York City
Canarsie, Brooklyn
1652 establishments in the Dutch Empire
New York City Designated Landmarks in Brooklyn
Wyckoff family